The Parish of Bherwerre is a parish of the County of St Vincent in New South Wales which formerly included the area that is now the Jervis Bay Territory, which was transferred to the Commonwealth of Australia in 1915. Because of this, the parish is now less than half the size it was in the nineteenth century. The Jervis Bay Territory Acceptance Act of 1915 mentions that  of the parish were transferred to the Commonwealth. The Seat of Government Acceptance Act of 1909 mentions that three separate parcels in the parish were planned to be transferred to the Commonwealth from Bherwerre, along with land in other nearby parishes, although the actual land transfer in 1915 was only made up of land in the Parish of Bherwerre. At the time, the parish was located in Clyde Shire.

The parish now includes the towns of Sanctuary Point and Vincentia, and also the village of Hyams Beach. The parish is bounded by St Georges Basin at Erowal Bay in the south, the Jervis Bay Territory in the south-east, Jervis Bay in the east and Moona Moona creek in the north.

References

Maps available at the New South Wales Parish maps preservation project

Parishes of St. Vincent County